"Right Now" is a song by Japanese rock band Asian Kung-Fu Generation. It was released as the single on January 6, 2016 and it was used as the theme song for the 2016 film, Pink and Gray. This is the second time the band didn't use Yusuke Nakamura's artwork on their single, instead they just used the simple artwork of pink and grey color to fit in with the film.

Music video
The music video for "Right Now" was directed by Pink and Gray's director, Isao Yukisada. The video features Kaho as actress and the band playing in the middle of the film set.

Track listing

Charts

References

Asian Kung-Fu Generation songs
2016 singles
Songs written by Masafumi Gotoh
2016 songs
Ki/oon Music singles
Songs written by Takahiro Yamada (musician)
Songs written for films